Moped was a New Zealand band formed in Palmerston North by three brothers, Gareth (guitar & backing vocals), Hayden (bass and lead vocals) and Karl Shearman (drums). They played a brand of groove saturated reggae rock, with lyrics which speak of a clear Christian commitment.

Albums
Moped released two albums and one EP during their career. Their first album, Noise From the Knee Drill, was released in 2002 and their second album, Welcome to the Exodus, was released in 2005. In 2006, the band saw the release of their farewell EP and DVD titled One More March. Noise From the Knee Drill was a more rock based album, and though it was a far less polished album (than later albums) it contained songs such as "Guilt Trip" and "This Means War". Welcome to the Exodus featured more reggae based songs (but not without the rock influence) such as "Roots Down", "Will You Come" and "Sunset, Sunrise." It concludes with an acoustic song, "Stick to your Guns."

Major concerts
They were regular performers at the Parachute Music Festival, as well as performing at Capital Teen Convention (CTC), Youth Of The Nation Conference and SamStock.

Breakup and final tour
In early 2006, Moped announced that they would be breaking up at the end of the year. The major reason for this was that they wanted to move on to do other things. In September, they embarked on a two-month tour of New Zealand to say goodbye to fans up and down the country and released the One more march EP/DVD. The tour concluded on 1 December in Wellington.

New Zealand rock music groups